Fabián Sambueza (born 1 August 1988) is an Argentine professional footballer who plays as a midfielder for Colombian club Junior. He is the younger brother of Rubens Sambueza.

Honours

Club

Junior
Categoría Primera A (2): 2018–II, 2019–I
Superliga Colombiana (1): 2019

References

External links 
 
 

1989 births
Living people
Argentine footballers
Argentine Primera División players
Primera Nacional players
Categoría Primera A players
Huracán de Comodoro Rivadavia footballers
Club Atlético Temperley footballers
Racing de Trelew players
Deportivo Roca players
Deportivo Cali footballers
Atlético Junior footballers
Independiente Santa Fe footballers
Argentine expatriate footballers
Argentine expatriate sportspeople in Colombia
Expatriate footballers in Colombia
People from Neuquén
Association football midfielders